The European Endowment for Democracy is a European non-governmental organisation with the stated purpose of promoting democracy, particularly in the European Neighbourhood, Turkey and the Western Balkans. It was established in 2013 following a proposal by the Polish Presidency of the European Council, and receives funding from the European Commission and twenty-three European countries.

See also 
National Endowment for Democracy

References

External links 

 

Organizations related to the European Union
Organisations based in Brussels
International organizations based in Europe
Organizations established in 2013
Intergovernmental human rights organizations
2013 establishments in the European Union
Democracy promotion